The following lists events that happened during 1848 in Australia.

Incumbents

Governors
Governors of the Australian colonies:
Governor of New South Wales – Sir Charles Augustus FitzRoy
Governor of South Australia – Lieutenant Colonel Frederick Holt Robe (to 2 August) then Sir Henry Fox Young
Governor of Tasmania – Sir William Denison
Governor of Western Australia as a Crown Colony – Lieutenant-Colonel Frederick Irwin (acting), then Captain Charles Fitzgerald.

Events
 Letters Patent of Queen Victoria declaring Melbourne a city are read on the steps of St Peters, Eastern Hill church.
 13 February – The first non-British ship carrying immigrants to arrive in Victoria was from Germany; the Goddefroy. Many of those on board were political refugees and known as Forty-Eighters.
 3 April – Explorer Ludwig Leichhardt was last seen on the Darling Downs. On that date he wrote a letter from MacPherson's Station, Cogoon. Leichhardt had set off for Swan River.
 11 March – The Savings Bank of South Australia opens with a single employee, trading from a room provided rent-free.
 29 August – The Cape Otway lighthouse in Victoria is lit for the first time.

Births

 4 February – Sir John Winthrop Hackett, Western Australian politician and newspaper proprietor (born in Ireland) (d. 1916)
 17 February – Louisa Lawson, writer, poet and feminist (d. 1920)
 24 February – Andrew Inglis Clark, Tasmanian politician and judge (d. 1907)
 18 May – Sir John Henniker Heaton, postal reformer, journalist, and politician (born in the United Kingdom) (d. 1914)
 27 May – David Charleston, South Australian politician (born in the United Kingdom) (d. 1934)
 3 June – Alexander Leeper, educationist (born in Ireland) (d. 1934)
 8 September – Sir Edward Charles Stirling, South Australian politician and anthropologist (d. 1919)
 15 October – Sir Langdon Bonython, South Australian politician and journalist (born in the United Kingdom) (d. 1939)
 18 October – Gregor McGregor, South Australian politician and trade union leader (born in the United Kingdom) (d. 1914)
 3 December – William Shiels, 16th Premier of Victoria (born in Ireland) (d. 1904)
 6 December – Sir Edward Hutton, 1st General Officer Commanding Australian Military Forces (born in the United Kingdom) (d. 1923)
 10 December – Frederick William Piesse, Tasmanian politician (d. 1902)
 16 December – Walter Madden, Victorian politician (born in Ireland) (d. 1925)
 Unknown – John Mather, artist (born in the United Kingdom) (d. 1916)

Deaths

 2 May – Frederick Garling, attorney and solicitor (born in the United Kingdom) (b. 1775)
 25 May – Sir Maurice Charles O'Connell, New South Wales politician and military commander (born in Ireland) (b. 1768)
 4 June – William Sorell, 3rd Lieutenant Governor of Van Diemen's Land (born in the West Indies and died in the United Kingdom) (b. 1775)
 18 July – Alexander Macleay, New South Wales politician and entomologist (born in the United Kingdom) (b. 1767)
 12 November – John Cadman, convict and publican (born in the United Kingdom) (b. 1758)

References

 
Australia
Years of the 19th century in Australia